Îles-de-la-Madeleine was a federal electoral district in Quebec, Canada, that was represented in the House of Commons of Canada from 1949 to 1968.

This riding was created in 1947 from Gaspé riding. It consisted of the county of Iles-de-la-Madeleine. The electoral district was abolished in 1966 when it was merged into Bonaventure riding.

Members of Parliament

This riding elected the following Members of Parliament:

Election results

See also 

 List of Canadian federal electoral districts
 Past Canadian electoral districts

External links 
 Riding history from the Library of Parliament

Former federal electoral districts of Quebec